The Final of the 2011 Emperor's Cup was held at National Olympic Stadium in Shinjuku, Tokyo on 1 January 2012. The match was contested between two second division sides, Kyoto Sanga FC who were defeated by FC Tokyo in regulation time.

Route to the final

Kyoto Sanga FC

FC Tokyo

Match

See also
2011 Emperor's Cup

References

Emperor's Cup
2011 in Japanese football
FC Tokyo matches
Kyoto Sanga FC matches